Eurekaton, Tennessee is a small but historically significant hamlet located approximately halfway between Memphis and Jackson. The town is mentioned in correspondence by both Vladimir Nabokov (who, with his wife, lodged there in the early 1950s while collecting butterfly specimens in its near vicinity) and by William Faulkner, among others.

Populated places in Haywood County, Tennessee